Kwaku Baprui Asante (26 March 1924 – 22 January 2018) was a Ghanaian diplomat, writer and politician. He was the Secretary to Ghana's First President Dr Kwame Nkrumah. Asante served under most Heads of States in Ghana, starting from Nkrumah, and also served as the Principal Secretary at African Affairs Secretariat from 1960 to 1966.

He was educated at Achimota School and later returned there to teach Mathematics.

Early life and education 
Born in Accra, Gold Coast, on 26 March 1924, Asante attended the O’Reilly Educational Institute, Tudu, Government Junior Boys' School, Adabraka, and Government Senior Boys’ School, Kinbu, from 1927 to 1937. He also attended Achimota College Upper Primary and Secondary School from 1938 to 1942, where also he taught mathematics (1945–48). He then proceeded to Durham University in Britain, where he obtained a BSc Mathematics in 1952.

Career 
He became a member of the Institute of Statisticians in 1953, before returning to Achimota College, where from 1953 to 1955 he taught mathematics.

He worked for six years at The Flagstaff House, and was Principal Secretary at the African Affairs Secretariat (1960–66). From 1967 to 1972, he was Ghana's Ambassador to Switzerland, also with concurrent to Australia, and from 1976 to 1978 he served as Ambassador to Belgium, Luxembourg, and the European Economic Community.

Provisional National Defence Council government 
Between 1982 and 1986, Asante served as the Secretary for Trade and Tourism in the Provisional National Defence Council government led by Jerry Rawlings. Asante also served as Secretary for Education and Culture between 1986 and 1990. Between 1991 and 1993 he was High Commissioner to the UK and Ireland.

Asante wrote a weekly column, "Voice from afar" in the national newspaper, the Daily Graphic. An anthology of his weekly articles was published as a book with the same title of his column in 2003.

Personal life 
He was married to Dzagbele Matilda Asante and had five children. Asante was a lifelong congregant of the Anglican Church. K. B. Asante was also a Freemason, belonging to the District Grand Lodge of Ghana under the United Grand Lodge of England.

Death and funeral 
He died on 22 January 2018 at the age of 93. He was accorded a ceremonial burial at the Forecourt of the State House in Accra.

References

External links
K.B. Asante, the patriot, diplomat and writer on GhanaWeb.com
"Voice from afar" on Graphic Online

1924 births
2018 deaths
Alumni of Achimota School
Alumni of University College, Durham
Ambassadors of Ghana to Switzerland
Ambassadors of Ghana to Belgium
Ambassadors of Ghana to Luxembourg
Ga-Adangbe people
Ghanaian civil servants
Ghanaian diplomats
Ghanaian educators
Ghanaian Freemasons
People from Greater Accra Region